The Pahiatua by-election of 1916 was a by-election held in the  electorate during the 19th New Zealand Parliament, on 17 August 1916. It was caused by the death of incumbent MP James Escott of the Reform Party on 28 July, and was won by Harold Smith with a majority of 420.

Results
The following table gives the election results:

Notes

References

Pahia
1916 elections in New Zealand
Politics of Manawatū-Whanganui